Maksim Stanislavovich Oreshkin (born 21 July 1982) is a Russian economist and politician who served as the Minister for Economic Development from 30 November 2016 to 15 January 2020. On 24 January 2020, he was appointed as Economic Adviser to President of Russia, Vladimir Putin.

Oreshkin was born on 21 July 1982 in Moscow. He graduated from one of Russia's leading universities – the Higher School of Economics – in 2004 and worked at several major banks, both Russian and foreign-owned.

In September 2013, Oreshkin joined the government as the head of the Directorate for Long-term Strategic planning of the Finance Ministry. In March 2015, he was appointed Deputy Minister of Finance.

On 15 January 2020, he resigned as part of the cabinet, after President Vladimir Putin delivered the Presidential Address to the Federal Assembly, in which he proposed several amendments to the constitution.

References

1982 births
Living people
1st class Active State Councillors of the Russian Federation
Economists from Moscow
Economy ministers of Russia
21st-century Russian politicians
Higher School of Economics alumni